The eighth season of Dancing with the Stars premiered on Top Channel on 7 October 2022, almost four years since it last aired on Vizion Plus. The host of this season was Bora Zemani, with Eno Popi joining as co-host.

In the judging panel were Armand Peza, Dalina Buzi, Kledi Kadiu and Valbona Selimllari.

The series was won by Sara Hoxha and her professional partner Luixhino Hala. Runners-up were Ardit Cuni and Jora Hodo, Elhaida Dani and Ledian Agallijaj, and Megi Pojani and Jurgen Bala.

Host and judges 
On 2 August 2022, a promo was published on social networks, thus showing that the eighth season of Dancing with the stars will start very soon and also after many hints it has been confirmed that the presenter of this season will be Bora Zemani, who also appears in the promo. On 30 September 2022, Eno Popi announced on the television show Wake Up, that he would be joining the show alongside Zemani as co-host.

On 2 September 2022, it was announced that the Italian dancer and actor Kledi Kadiu, will be the first judge. On 28 September 2022, Dalina Buzi announced on the television show Goca dhe Gra on Top Channel that she will be the second judge of the show.  On 1 October 2022, Top Channel announced that Valbona Selimllari and Armand Peza were the third and fourth judges.

Couples 
On 2 September 2022, the production of Dancing with the stars announced on their Instagram-account that the first celebrity participant will be Alban Nimani. Celebrity contestants continued to be revealed until 22 September 2022, when the full line-up was announced.

Scoring chart

 indicates the couple eliminated that week
 indicates the couple that was in the bottom two or three, but was not eliminated
 indicates the couple won immunity from the first part of that week
 indicates the couple was immune from elimination
 indicates the winning couple
 indicates the finalist couple(s)
Red text the couple(s) with the lowest score for that week
Green text the couple(s) with the highest score for that week
"—" indicates the couple(s) did not dance that week

Average chart
This table only counts for dances scored on a traditional 40-points scale. Scores from guest judges are not included.

Highest and lowest scoring performances of the series
The best and worst performances in each dance according to the judges' 40-point scale are as follows. Scores from guest judges are not included.

Couples' highest and lowest scoring dances
Scores are based upon a potential 40-point maximum. Scores from guest judges are not included.

Weekly scores and songs
Unless indicated otherwise, individual judges scores in the charts below (given in parentheses) are listed in this order from left to right: Dalina Buzi, Armand Peza, Kledi Kadiu, Valbona Selimllari.

Week 1: First Dances
Running order

Week 2: First Elimination
Running order

Week 3: Top Fest Night
Musical guests: Besa Kokëdhima—"Engjejt Vrasin Njelloj"/"Unik"/"Fishekzjarre"

Running order

Week 4: Halloween Night
Running order

Judges' votes to save
Dalina: Gent & Emanuela
Armand: Gent & Emanuela
Kledi: Did not vote
Valbona: Gent & Emanuela

Week 5: Latin Night
Part 1 - Team dance
Running order

Part 2 - One unlearned dance
Running order

Judges' votes to save
Dalina: Salsano & Lori
Armand: Salsano & Lori
Kledi: Did not vote
Valbona: Salsano & Lori

Week 6: DigitAlb Movie Night
Running order

Judges' votes to save
Dalina: Arbër & Erisa
Armand: Gent & Emanuela
Kledi: Arbër & Erisa (Since the other judges were not unanimous, Kledi, as head judge, made the final decision to save Arbër & Erisa.)
Valbona: Arbër & Erisa

Week 7
Running order

Judges' votes to save
Dalina: Julka & Silvester
Armand: Debora & Niko
Kledi: Julka & Silvester (Since the other judges were not unanimous, Kledi, as head judge, made the final decision to save Julka & Silvester.)
Valbona: Julka & Silvester

Week 8: Albanian dances night
Individual judges' scores are given in this order from left to right: Dalina Buzi, Armand Peza, Lili Cingu, Kledi Kadiu, Valbona Selimllari.

Lili Cingu was a guest judge.

Running order

Week 9: Switch-Up Night
The celebrities performed one unlearned dance with a different partner selected by themselves.
Running order

Dance-Off

Judges' votes to save
Dalina: Ardit & Jora
Armand: Ardit & Jora
Kledi: Did not vote, but would have voted to save Ardit & Jora
Valbona: Ardit & Jora

Week 10: Elvana Gjata Night
Individual judges' scores are given in this order from left to right: Dalina Buzi, Armand Peza, Elvana Gjata, Kledi Kadiu, Valbona Selimllari.
Musical guests: Elvana Gjata—"Me tana"/"Puthe"/"Clap Clap"/"Loti"

Each couple performed one dance to a song by Elvana Gjata. Gjata was a guest judge.
Running order

Week 11: Quarter-Final
Each couple performed one trio dance and one unlearned dance. Each couple chose one member from their Family or Friends to dance with them.
Running order

Judges' votes to save
Dalina: Elhaida & Ledian
Armand: Elhaida & Ledian
Kledi: Did not vote
Valbona: Elhaida & Ledian

Week 12: Semifinal
Each couple performed one unlearned ballroom dance and one unlearned Latin dance. Two couples were eliminated at the end of the night in a double elimination.

Running order

Dance-Off

Judges' votes to save
Dalina: Ardit & Jora
Armand: Ardit & Jora
Kledi: Did not vote
Valbona: Ardit & Jora

Week 13: Final
Running order

Dance chart
 Highest scoring dance
 Lowest scoring dance
 Not performed due to immunity
 Immunity

Week 1: Bachata, Cha-Cha-Cha, Charleston, Foxtrot, Jive, Paso Doble, Quickstep, Rock and Roll, Rumba, Salsa, Samba, Swing, Tango, Waltz
Week 2: One unlearned dance (Introducing Contemporary)
Week 3: One unlearned dance (Introducing Latin)
Week 4: One unlearned dance (Introducing Viennese Waltz)
Week 5: One unlearned dance & team dance
Week 6: One unlearned dance
Week 7: One unlearned dance
Week 8: One unlearned dance (Introducing Vallja e Shqipeve, 	Vallja e Osman Takes, Vallja e Tiranes, Vallja e Dibres, Vallja e Librazhdit, Vallja e Tropojës, Vallja Gorarçe, Vallja e Rugovës)
Week 9: One unlearned dance (Introducing Argentine tango)
Week 10: One unlearned dance
Week 11: One unlearned dance (Introducing Freestyle)
Week 12: One unlearned dance
Week 13: Couple's first dance, Freestyle and Showdance

References

External links 
Official Website

2022 Albanian television seasons
2023 Albanian television seasons
Albania8